Tod is a given name. Notable persons with that name include:

Given name
 Tod Ashley (born 1965), American singer-songwriter
 Tod Bowman (born 1965), American legislator from Iowa
 Tod Scott Brody (1956–2015), American film producer, editor, and photographer
 Tod Brown (born 1936), American Roman Catholic bishop
 Tod Brown (baseball) (born 1971), American baseball coach
 Tod Bunting (born 1958), American Adjutant General of Kansas
 Tod Robinson Caldwell (1818–1874), American lawyer and governor of North Carolina
 Tod Carroll, American writer and film producer
 Tod Carter, American animation director
 Tod Davies (born 1955), American writer and publisher
 Tod Dockstader (1932–2015), American composer of electronic music
 Tod Ensign (died 2014), American veteran's rights lawyer
 Tod Fennell (born 1984), Canadian actor
 Tod Frye, American computer game programmer
 Tod Goldberg (born 1971), American mystery author
 Tod Gordon (born 1955), American wrestling promoter
 Tod Hanson (born 1963), British painter and graphic artist
 Tod Hartje (born 1968), American ice hockey center
 Tod Howarth (born 1957), American guitarist
 Tod Johnston, Australian radio and television host
 Tod Kowalczyk (born 1966), American basketball coach
 Tod R. Lauer (born 1957), American astronomer
 Tod Leiweke (born 1960), American sports executive
 Tod Lending, American film producer and director
 Tod Lindberg, American political expert
 Tod Long (born 1970), American sprinter
 Tod Machover (born 1953), American composer
 Tod McBride (born 1976), American football cornerback
 Tod H. Mikuriya (1933–2007), American psychiatrist and medical cannabis advocate
 Tod Murphy (born 1963), American college basketball coach and former National Basketball Association player
 Tod Ohnstad (born 1952), American labor union official and assemblyman
 Tod Papageorge (born 1940), American photographer
 Tod Sacerdoti, American businessperson
 Tod Strike, Australian actor and singer
 Tod Williams (born 1943), American architect, of Tod Williams Billie Tsien Architects
 Tod Williams (filmmaker) (born 1968), American film director (and son of the architect)
 Tod D. Wolters (born 1960), American United States Air Force general

Nickname
 Tod Brynan (1863–1925), American baseball player
 Tod Campeau (1923–2009), Canadian ice hockey player
 Tod Collins (1874–1932), Australian rules football player
 Tod Davis (1924–1978), American baseball player
 Tod Dennehey (1899–1977), American baseball player
 Tod Eberle (1886–1967), American football and basketball coach
 Tod Goodwin (1911–1997), American football player
 Tod Rockwell (1900–1952), American football player and coach
 Tod Sloan (baseball) (1890–1956), American baseball player 
 Tod Sloan (ice hockey) (1927–2017), Canadian ice hockey player
 Tod Sloan (jockey) (1874–1933), American jockey
 Tod Sweeney (1919–2001), British Army officer

Fictional characters
 Tod Hackett, protagonist of the 1939 novel The Day of the Locust
 Tod Stiles, a character on the television show Route 66
 Tod, a boy in Tod of the Fens, Elinor Whitney Field's 1928 children's novel
 Tod, a red fox from The Fox and the Hound

See also

Tó, nicknames
Ton (given name)

English masculine given names
Lists of people by nickname